Khandaghosh is a village in Khandaghosh CD block in Bardhaman Sadar South subdivision of Purba Bardhaman district in the state of West Bengal, India.

Geography

Urbanisation
95.54% of the population of Bardhaman Sadar South subdivision live in the rural areas. Only 4.46% of the population live in the urban areas, and that is the lowest proportion of urban population amongst the four subdivisions in Purba Bardhaman district. The map alongside presents some of the notable locations in the subdivision. All places marked in the map are linked in the larger full screen map.

Police station
Khandaghosh police station has jurisdiction over Khandaghosh CD Block. The area covered is 256.13 km2.

Demographics
As per the 2011 Census of India Khandaghosh had a total population of 7,717, of which 3,198 (52%) were males and 3,799 (48%) were females. Population below 6 years was 794. The total number of literates in Khandaghosh was 4,736 (68.41% of the population over 6 years).

Transport
The State Highway 8 running from Santaldih (in Purulia district) to Majhdia (in Nadia district) passes through Khandaghosh. The road is locally known as Bardhaman-Bankura Road.

Education
Khandaghosh High School is a coeducational high school affiliated with the West Bengal Board of Secondary Education.

Healthcare
Khandaghosh block primary health centre at Khandaghosh (with 15 beds) is the main medical facility in Khandaghosh CD block. There are primary health centres at Khudkuri, PO Sankari (with 4 beds), Kuley (Gayeshpur), PO Chagram (with 10 beds) and Torkona (with 4 beds). In 2012, the average monthly patients attending Khandaghosh BPHC were 8,094 and average monthly admissions were 51. It handled 454 annual emergency admissions.

See also - Healthcare in West Bengal

References

Villages in Purba Bardhaman district